Joel Vieting (born 11 May 2003) is a German footballer who plays as an attacking midfielder for Berliner AK 07.

References

2003 births
Living people
German footballers
Association football midfielders
SC Fortuna Köln players
FC Viktoria Köln players
Berliner AK 07 players
3. Liga players
Regionalliga players